Alexandra Louise Verbeek (born 4 June 1973, in Amstelveen) is a sailor from the Netherlands, who represented her country at the 1996 Summer Olympics  in Savannah. Verbeek took the 13th place as crew in the Women's 470 together with helmsman Carolijn Brouwer.

Professional career
 Event manager: Kumpany (2001–2005)
 Pusher: XpeditionGold (2001–2008)
 Manager Marketing en Sponsoring: Topsport Amsterdam (2005–2008)
 General Manager: Sporttop (2008–2009)
 Owner:AlexAction (2009 – Present)

Further reading

2000 Olympics (Syndney)

References

Living people
1973 births
Sportspeople from Amstelveen
Dutch female sailors (sport)
Sailors at the 2000 Summer Olympics – 470
Olympic sailors of the Netherlands